Calocosmus nigritarsis is a species of beetle in the family Cerambycidae. It was described by Fisher in 1942. It is known from the Dominican Republic.

References

Calocosmus
Beetles described in 1942